Waldo of Reichenau (sometimes Walto) (c. 740 - 814, Paris) was an abbot and Carolingian official.

Life
Waldo belonged to a noble Frankish family from Wetterau. His father was Richbold Count of Breisgau and his older brother was Rupert Baron von Aargau. He entered the Abbey of Reichenau in 784 under Abbot Peter, brother of Hildegard of the Vinzgau, Charlemagne's second wife.

Upon Peter's death in 786, Waldo succeeded him as abbot, a position he held until 806. Under Waldo, the library and scriptorium of Reichenau Abbey "grew to rival the finest in the Frankish kingdom".  Waldo was instrumental in helping to establish a fraternal network among the various monastic schools. He sent the monk Odilleoz, brother of Haito, head of the monastic school at Reichenau, to Tours to study under Alcuin. Upon his return, Odilleoz brought manuscripts and other valuable objects from Alcuin.

Charlemagne placed him in charge of the Bishopric of Pavia and Basel in 791. According to Johannes Fried, Waldo served as one of the advisers of the young Pepin of Italy. In 806 Charlemagne made Waldo the abbot of Saint-Denis in Paris where he died in 814.

Walafrid Strabo's Liber de visionibus Wettini describes Waldo as performing penance in purgatory for inconsiderate deeds towards the monk Wetti of Reichenau, a teacher at Reichenau when he was abbot.

References

Sources

External links

 Historical website on Basel

Bishops of Pavia

Abbots of Saint Gall
8th-century Burgundian bishops
8th-century Italian bishops

740s births
814 deaths
Year of birth uncertain